Verônica Mauadie de Almeida (born 15 May 1975) is a Brazilian Paralympic swimmer who competes in international elite competitions. She is a Paralympic bronze medalist, double World bronze medalist and a double Parapan American Games medalist.

References

1975 births
Living people
Sportspeople from Salvador, Bahia
Paralympic swimmers of Brazil
Swimmers at the 2008 Summer Paralympics
Swimmers at the 2012 Summer Paralympics
Swimmers at the 2016 Summer Paralympics
Medalists at the 2008 Summer Paralympics
Medalists at the 2015 Parapan American Games
Medalists at the World Para Swimming Championships
Brazilian female butterfly swimmers
Brazilian female breaststroke swimmers
S7-classified Paralympic swimmers
20th-century Brazilian women
21st-century Brazilian women